Seguenzia is a genus of sea snails, marine gastropod mollusks in the family Seguenziidae.

This genus was named after Giuseppe Seguenza (1833-1889), the palaeontologist at Messina, Italy.

Description
The thin shell has a turbinate or subtrochoid shape. It is translucent, the outer layer very slight, somewhat nacreous in fresh specimens. There is no epidermis. The shell contains spiral carinations. The upper part of the body whorl is deeply and widely grooved. The aperture is irregular and sinuous behind. The columella is twisted and abruptly notched below. It has a small tooth-like process. The base of the shell shows a sinus. It is deeply umbilicated or imperforate. The thin operculum is oval, with a subcentral nucleus and with obsolete, numerous concentric lines.

Species
According to the World Register of Marine Species (WoRMS), the following species with valid name are included within the genus Seguenzia :

Seguenzia antarctica Thiele, 1925
Seguenzia balicasagensis Poppe, Tagaro & Dekker, 2006
Seguenzia beloni Poppe, Tagaro & Dekker, 2006
Seguenzia cervola Dall, 1919
Seguenzia chariessa Marshall, 1991
Seguenzia chelina Marshall, 1983
Seguenzia compta Marshall, 1983
Seguenzia conopia Marshall, 1983
Seguenzia costulifera Schepman, 1909
Seguenzia dabfari Poppe, Tagaro & Dekker, 2006
Seguenzia dautzenbergi Schepman, 1909
 † Seguenzia donaldi Ladd, 1982 
Seguenzia eidalima Marshall, 1991
Seguenzia elegans Jeffreys, 1885
Seguenzia elegantissima Poppe, Tagaro & Dekker, 2006
Seguenzia emmeles Marshall, 1991
Seguenzia engonia B.A. Marshall, 1991
Seguenzia eritima Verrill, 1884
Seguenzia eutyches Marshall, 1991
Seguenzia fatigans Barnard, 1963
Seguenzia floridana Dall, 1927
Seguenzia formosa Jeffreys, 1876 
Seguenzia fulgida Marshall, 1983
Seguenzia giovia Dall, 1919
 † Seguenzia glabella B. A. Marshall, 1983 
Seguenzia hapala Woodring, 1928
Seguenzia hosyu Habe, 1953
Seguenzia iota Marshall, 1991
Seguenzia keikoae Poppe, Tagaro & Dekker, 2006
Seguenzia levii Marshall, 1991
Seguenzia lineata Watson, 1879
Seguenzia louiseae A.H. Clarke, 1961
 Seguenzia macleani Geiger, 2017
Seguenzia matara Marshall, 1988
Seguenzia metivieri Marshall, 1991
Seguenzia mirabilis Okutani, 1964
Seguenzia monocingulata Seguenza, 1876
Seguenzia nipponica Okutani, 1964
Seguenzia nitida Verrill, 1884
Seguenzia occidentalis Dall, 1908
Seguenzia orientalis Thiele, 1925
Seguenzia platamodes Marshall, 1991
Seguenzia praeceps Marshall, 1991
 † Seguenzia prisca B. A. Marshall, 1983 
 † Seguenzia propheta Lozouet, 1999 
Seguenzia richeri Marshall, 1991
 † Seguenzia serrata B. A. Marshall, 1983 
Seguenzia soyoae (Okutani, 1964)
 † Seguenzia statiana Sosso, Bertolaso & Dell'Angelo, 2020 
Seguenzia stegastris Marshall, 1991
Seguenzia stephanica Dall, 1908
Seguenzia sumatrensis Thiele, 1925
Seguenzia textilis Marshall, 1983
Seguenzia transenna Marshall, 1983
Seguenzia triteia Salvador, Cavallari & Simone, 2014
Seguenzia trochiformis Poppe, Tagaro & Dekker, 2006
Seguenzia wareni Marshall, 1991

Species brought into synonymy
Seguenzia caliana Dall, 1919: synonym of Seguenzia stephanica Dall, 1908
Seguenzia carinata Jeffreys, 1876 synonym of Carenzia carinata (Jeffreys, 1877)
Seguenzia certoma Dall, 1919: synonym of Seguenzia stephanica Dall, 1908
Seguenzia cazioti Dautzenberg, 1925: synonym of Quinnia cazioti (Dautzenberg, 1925)
Seguenzia ionica Watson, 1878 synonym of Quinnia ionica (Watson, 1878)
Seguenzia laxa Jeffreys, 1885: synonym of Haloceras laxa (Jeffreys, 1885)
Seguenzia megaloconcha Rokop, 1972: synonym of Seguenzia cervola Dall, 1919
Seguenzia melvillii Schepman, 1909: synonym of Carenzia melvillii (Schepman, 1909)
Seguenzia polita Verco, 1906: synonym of Quinnia polita (Verco, 1906)
 Seguenzia quinni J. H. McLean, 1985: synonym of Seguenzia giovia Dall, 1919
Seguenzia reticulata (Philippi, 1844): synonym of Ancistrobasis reticulata (Philippi, 1844)
Seguenzia rushi Dall, 1927: synonym of Quinnia rushi (1927)
Seguenzia siberutensis Thiele, 1925: synonym of Halystina siberutensis (Thiele, 1925)
Seguenzia simplex Barnard, 1963: synonym of Halystina simplex (Barnard, 1963)
Seguenzia sykesi Schepman, 1909: synonym of Quinnia sykesi (Schepman, 1909)
Seguenzia tricarinata Jeffreys, 1885: synonym of Haloceras tricarinata (Jeffreys, 1885)

References

 Quinn J.F. (1983). A revision of the Seguenziacea Verrill, 1884 (Gastropoda : Prosobranchia). I. Summary and evaluation of the superfamily,  Proceedings of the Biological Society of Washington, 96(4): pp. 725–757

External links
 Jeffreys, J. G. (1876). Preliminary report of the biological results of a cruise in H.M.S. Valorous to Davis Straits in 1875. Proceedings of the Royal Society of London. 25: 177-237.
 Marshall, B. A. (1983). Recent and Tertiary Seguenziidae (Mollusca: Gastropoda) from the New Zealand region. New Zealand Journal of Zoology. 10: 235-262.
 Harris, G. F. (1897). Catalogue of Tertiary Mollusca in the Department of Geology, British Museum (Natural History). Part I. The Australasian Tertiary Mollusca. London: British Museum (Natural History). xxvi + 406 pp., 6 pls.

 
Seguenziidae
Taxa named by John Gwyn Jeffreys